Manulife Plaza, also known as Lee Garden One, is an office skyscraper in Causeway Bay, Hong Kong Island, Hong Kong. The building is currently the 16th tallest in Hong Kong and the tallest in Causeway Bay. It also has seven-storey podium hosting a shopping mall.

History

The site was developed in the 1920s as part of Lee Garden by Hysan Lee. The Lee Gardens Hotel opened in 1971 and was demolished in August 1994 to make way for the current building.

Mall
The base of Lee Garden One is a shopping mall, opened in October 1997. International luxury brands include Louis Vuitton, Chanel, Hermès, Dior, Cartier, BVLGARI, Joyce Boutique, Valentino. And the 4th to 5th floors of the mall are restaurants, respectively West Villa Restaurant and An Nam.

See also
List of tallest buildings in Hong Kong

References

External links

Skyscraper office buildings in Hong Kong
Shopping centres in Hong Kong
Office buildings completed in 1997